Jason Dawkins is a Democratic member of the Pennsylvania House of Representatives representing the 179th House district in Philadelphia, Pennsylvania. Dawkins is a member of the Pennsylvania Legislative Black Caucus.

References

External links
PA House profile
Official Party website

Living people
Democratic Party members of the Pennsylvania House of Representatives
Politicians from Philadelphia
African-American state legislators in Pennsylvania
21st-century American politicians
Year of birth missing (living people)
21st-century African-American politicians